Chunni Lal is a famous character of Bengali romance novel Devdas written by Sarat Chandra Chattopadhyay.

Chunni Lal or Chuni Lal may also refer to:

Chuni Lal Katial, a South Asian doctor and politician, who became the first UK's South Asian mayor, after being elected mayor of Finsbury in 1938.
Naib Subedar Chuni Lal, Ashok Chakra, Vir Chakra, Sena Medal (Gallantry) was a soldier of 8th Battalion of Jammu and Kashmir Light Infantry (8 JAK LI) of Indian Army.
Chuni Lal Bhagat, member of Bharatiya Janta Party, is an Indian politician and Minister for Local Government and Medical Education & Research in the present Punjab Government.